David M. Gardner (born July 8, 1981) is an American politician, who served as a Republican member of the Nevada Assembly from 2014 to 2016. He represented the southwest part of the Las Vegas Valley. Gardner defeated Democratic nominee Steve Yeager in 2014 general election, replacing Andrew Martin.

Gardner is an attorney and is married with four children.

References

External links
 Campaign Facebook page
 

1981 births
Living people
Republican Party members of the Nevada Assembly
People from the Las Vegas Valley
21st-century American politicians